Dominic Kiarie is Senior Business Executive and executive director of Century Developments Limited.

He holds a Master of Philosophy (M.Phil.) Degree in Finance from University of Cambridge and a Bachelor of Science (Hons) Degree in Actuarial Science from City University, London.

Early life and education
Kiarie was born in Nakuru, Kenya. He went to Mang'u High School in Thika and later to the United Kingdom for both his undergraduate and graduate studies.

Career 
Until 2015, Kiarie was the Group CEO for UAP Group, a financial services group with operations in 6 countries in East and Central Africa including Kenya, Uganda, Tanzania, South Sudan, Rwanda and Democratic Republic of Congo (DRC). He joined UAP in August 2011 as the Deputy Group CEO and was appointed Group CEO in December 2012, replacing James Muguiyi who left the organisation upon his retirement.

Prior to joining UAP Group, Kiarie was the Founding Chief executive Office of Britam Asset Managers (BAM), the asset management subsidiary of the Britam Insurance Group. Kiarie served as BAM's CEO for 7 years and is credited with growing the firm's assets under management from inception to position the firm as a market leader in Kenya. During his tenure at Britam, he was elected as founding Chairman of the Association of Collective Investments Scheme (ACIS) in Kenya in recognition of his innovative contributions to the growth of the Fund Management and Collective Investment Schemes industry in Kenya.

References

Living people
Kenyan business executives
Chief executives in the finance industry
Alumni of the University of Cambridge
Alumni of City, University of London
Alumni of Bayes Business School
Actuaries
People from Nairobi
Year of birth missing (living people)